Professor Jussi Kalervo Huttunen (born 1941 in Helsinki) is a physician (1966 University of Helsinki), scientist, and former director general of the National Public Health Institute of Finland (1978-2003). He is an internist by training, and served as associate professor of internal medicine at the University of Kuopio 1975–1978. As the first director general of the reformed (1982) National Public Health Institute he guided the institute from previously routine microbiological and clinical chemistry laboratory to an internationally recognized research institute in public health.

Throughout his career Huttunen has been involved in many different organisations, and he has been a well-known health care expert often consulted by the government as well as by international and local authorities. He served as an acting director general and department chief at the Ministry of Social Welfare and Health (2000-2001). One of the longest activities is in the Finnish Medical Association Duodecim: he acted several years as editor of its journal Duodecim, and in several positions in the activities including presidency of the Association (1996-1999). He has also been president of the Finnish Diabetes Research Foundation (1985-1991), Finnish Cancer Research Foundation (1989-1990), Finnish Cancer Association (1992-1995), and Finnish Heart Association (1998-2003), among others. International assignments include presidency of the Governing Council of the International Agency for Research on Cancer (IARC, 1990-1992), Nordic Cancer Union (1991), and vice presidency of a committee evaluating the Framework Programs of the European Union (2008). He has belonged to editorial boards of several international scientific journals and was editor of Annals of Clinical Research (1984-1989).

Huttunen started his research career as medical biochemist, and presented his dissertation for doctor of medical sciences degree on sugar metabolism (1966). Subsequently, his interests have been in important national diseases such as cardiovascular diseases and diabetes, as well as nutrition. Even as director general he was actively involved in epidemiological studies on cardiovascular and metabolic diseases. He has also been concerned on great health differences between social groups. He holds honorary doctorate in medicine from the University of Kuopio (2000) and many other honours.

References

External links
 National Institute for Health and Welfare

Finnish public health doctors
Physicians from Helsinki
Living people
1941 births